Bendigo's Fresh FM 101.5, also known as Bendigo's Best Sport, (call sign: 3BBS) is a community radio station broadcast in Bendigo, Australia. It began in 1983 as 3CCC based in Harcourt using the frequency 103.9 FM.

History
The Australian Broadcasting Tribunal allocated Fresh 89.5 FM a community broadcasting license in 1983 to provide a community broadcasting service within the Bendigo area.

After 25 years of broadcasting, the Fresh FM had is license cancelled in 2006 by Australian Communications and Media Authority when the station failed to lodge renewal applications despite 12 months of frequent reminders. This resulted in a handful of on-air announcers walking from the community station, citing difficulties with management and disagreements with new programming (including increased use of pre-recorded content from 98.9 FM (Brisbane)).

The station was found in breach of its temporary license conditions in 2008 "by failing to represent the Bendigo Community". The ACMA stated that annual general meetings to allow members to contribute to the operation of the station were not held between 2001 and 2006.

In a plan to transfer the 89.5 frequency to ABC NewsRadio to broadcast national parliament, the ACMA suggested Fresh and fellow community station Phoenix FM share the 101.5 frequency with Central Victoria Gospel Radio. Finally, after sharing a frequency with the then-testing Phoenix FM on 89.5, the ACMA allocated the 101.5 frequency to Fresh FM in 2010 and Phoenix to 106.7, Gospel radio to 105.1.

In 2014, Fresh FM became the first local radio station to broadcast a live Victorian Women's Football League match at the Queen Elizabeth Oval.

Format
Fresh FM is known for its local sports broadcasts, including Central Victorian netball, basketball, and football, and has broadcast live AFL games via the NIRS. Listeners are urged to text "SMS requests" into the station with song requests during the work day, the music tailored primarily to the 70s, 80s and 90s decades of music.

See also 
 List of radio stations in Australia

References 

Radio stations in Bendigo
Bendigo